Super Eurobeat Presents Euro Dream Land is a remix album, consisting of recordings by Japanese all-girl dance band Dream, released in the late 2000 by Avex Trax.

As an album in the Super Eurobeat Presents : J-Euro series, Euro Dream Land mainly features eurobeat remixes of previously released Dream's songs. The album also contains one megamix and several cover versions of eurobeat songs originally made in Italy.



Tracks

Further details

Euro Dream Land is an album in the Super Eurobeat Presents : J-Euro series launched in 2000, along with Ayu-ro Mix 1–2 featuring Ayumi Hamasaki, Euro Every Little Thing featuring Every Little Thing, Hyper Euro MAX featuring MAX, Euro Global featuring globe, J-Euro Best and J-Euro Non-Stop Best.

The album appeared on Oricon's weekly album chart six times and reached #10 by November 6, 2000.

Track 12 is a megamix with 7 tracks. The non-stop mixing was handled by Katsunari Mochizuki and Seiji Honma.

References

Dream (Japanese group)
Euro Dream Land
2000 remix albums